Rituparna Das (born 2 October 1996) is an Indian badminton player.

Achievements

BWF International Challenge/Series (3 titles, 3 runners-up) 
Women's singles

  BWF International Challenge tournament
  BWF International Series tournament
  BWF Future Series tournament

References

External links
 

Living people
1996 births
People from Purba Medinipur district
Racket sportspeople from West Bengal
Sportswomen from West Bengal
Indian female badminton players